The Physics of Metals and Metallography  (Phys. Met. Metallogr.) [ (ФММ), or Fizika metallov i metallovedenie (Fiz. Met. Metalloved.)] is a peer-reviewed Russian scientific journal concerning metals and metal alloys. It was established in 1955 by the Academy of Sciences of the Soviet Union. English translations of recent volumes are available through Springer Science+Business Media. Starting in January 1992, the Russian Academy of Sciences and Pleiades Publishing, Inc. began a joint venture to create English translations of the journal articles.

Published in Russian by Nauka, it received a positive review as showing the contributions of Soviet research in metal science.

References

Physics journals
Russian-language journals
English-language journals
Monthly journals
Nauka academic journals
Russian Academy of Sciences academic journals